Magnifique was the lead ship of the 3-ship Magnifique class 74-gun ship of the line of the French Navy.

Career 
In 1760, Magnifique was under Duchaffault, and patrolled off Martinique, along with Hébé, under La Touche Beauregard.

Captain Brach captained Magnifique at the Battle of Ushant on 27 July 1778, at the Battle of Grenada on 6 July 1779, and at the Battle of Martinique on 17 April 1780.

Fate 
On 15 August 1782, Magnifique was wrecked along the rocky shore of Lovells Island, in Boston Harbor, MA, USA. She was rumoured to have been carrying "long-lost treasure."  According to a US National Park Service Guide, the submerged vessel is still visible from N 42° 19.902’ W 070° 55.818’ during periods of calm.

On 3 September 1782 the Continental Congress decided to present the ship of the line  to King Louis XVI of France to replace Magnifique. The gift was to symbolize the new nation's "appreciation for France's service to and sacrifices in behalf of the cause of the American patriots".

Sources and references 
 Notes

Citations

References
 

External links
 

Ships of the line of the French Navy
Magnifique-class ships of the line
1750 ships
Shipwrecks in the Atlantic Ocean
Maritime incidents in 1782